Aureliano Bolognesi (15 November 1930 in Sestri Ponente, Italy – 30 March 2018 in Genoa) was an Italian boxer.

Amateur career
Bolognesi was the Lightweight gold medalist at the 1952 Helsinki Olympics.

1952 Olympic results
Bolognesi's results are as follows:

Round of 32: bye
Round of 16: Defeated Bobby Bickle (United States) by decision, 2-1
Quarterfinal: Defeated István Juhász (Hungary) by decision, 2-1
Semifinal: Defeated Erkki Pakkanen (Finland) by decision, 3-0
Final: Defeated Aleksy Antkiewicz (Poland) by decision, 2-1 (won gold medal)

Pro career
Bolognesi turned pro in 1954 and fought mainly in Italy, and retired in 1956 having won 17, lost 2 and drawn 2 with 2 KOs.

References

External links
 
 
 
 

1930 births
2018 deaths
Italian male boxers
Lightweight boxers
Olympic boxers of Italy
Olympic gold medalists for Italy
Olympic medalists in boxing
Boxers at the 1952 Summer Olympics
Medalists at the 1952 Summer Olympics
Sportspeople from Genoa